Jennifer Lester Moffitt (born 1980) is an American organic farmer and government official from California and the Under Secretary of Agriculture for Marketing and Regulatory Programs at the United States Department of Agriculture in the Biden administration; she is the first woman to serve in this position. Moffitt previously served as the Undersecretary at the California Department of Food and Agriculture.

Education and career 

Moffitt is a graduate of Brown University and the California Agricultural Leadership Program. She was the Managing Director at Dixon Ridge Farms, her family’s organic walnut farm and processing operation, for ten years from 2005 to 2015. From 2002 to 2005, she worked at American Farmland Trust. In 2015 she was appointed by Governor Jerry Brown to serve as Deputy Secretary at the California Department of Food and Agriculture and was promoted to Undersecretary in 2018. In 2019, she was reappointed to serve as Undersecretary by Governor Gavin Newsom.

On April 27, 2021, President Joe Biden announced Moffitt to be his nominee to be the Under Secretary of Agriculture for Marketing and Regulatory Programs. Secretary of the California Department of Food and Agriculture Karen Ross endorsed the nomination. On April 28, 2021, her nomination was sent to the Senate. On July 26, 2021, her nomination was reported favorably out of committee. On August 11, 2021, she was confirmed by the Senate by voice vote.

Personal life 

Moffitt is the daughter of Russ and Kathy Lester and grew up on her family's organic walnut farm in Winters, California. She lives in Davis, California with her family.

References

External links 
 "Jennifer Lester Moffitt Confirmed to Serve as USDA Under Secretary for Marketing and Regulatory Programs"

Living people
21st-century American women politicians
United States Department of Agriculture officials
Biden administration personnel
American women farmers
Brown University alumni
Farmers from California
Organic farmers
People from Winters, California
21st-century American politicians
1980 births